Theclinesthes is a genus of butterflies in the family Lycaenidae. The species of this genus are found in the Australasian realm.

Species
Theclinesthes albocincta (Waterhouse, 1903)
Theclinesthes eremicola (Röber, 1891)
Theclinesthes hesperia Sibatani & Grund, 1978
Theclinesthes miskini (Lucas, 1889)
Theclinesthes onycha (Hewitson, 1865)
Theclinesthes serpentata (Herrich-Schäffer, 1869)
Theclinesthes sulpitius (Miskin, 1890)

References

Polyommatini
Lycaenidae genera